Katie Snowden (born 9 March 1994) is a British middle-distance runner specialising in the 1500 metres. She finished fourth in the event at the 2022 European Athletics Championships.

Snowden represented Great Britain at the 2020 Summer Olympics in Tokyo.

Career
Katie Snowden won the girls' 800 metres event at the 2011 Commonwealth Youth Games held in Douglas, Isle of Man.

In 2015, she placed sixth in the women's 800 metres at the European Under-23 Championships held in Tallinn, Estonia.

Snowden competed in the women's 1500 metres at the 2018 Commonwealth Games held in Gold Coast, Australia.

She finished in sixth place in the women's 1500 metres at the 2021 European Indoor Championships held in Toruń, Poland. Whilst representing Great Britain at the postponed 2020 Summer Olympics in Tokyo, Snowden ran a personal best time of 4:02.77 in the third heat to qualify for the semi finals of the women's 1500 metres.

Statistics

International competitions

Personal bests
 800 metres – 1:59.72 (Szczecin 2022)
 1000 metres – 2:35.54 (Birmingham 2018)
 1000 metres indoor – 2:37.46 (Birmingham 2023)
 1500 metres – 4:02.77 (Tokyo 2021)
 1500 metres indoor – 4:03.98 (New York, NY 2023)
 Mile – 4:25.72 (Zagreb 2022)
 Mile indoor – 4:21.19 (New York, NY 2023)
 3000 metres indoor – 8:47.41 (Boston, MA 2023)

References

External links
 

Living people
1994 births
Place of birth missing (living people)
British female middle-distance runners
Athletes (track and field) at the 2018 Commonwealth Games
Commonwealth Games competitors for England
Athletes (track and field) at the 2020 Summer Olympics
Olympic athletes of Great Britain
21st-century British women